Thomas William Saunderson Patton OBE (27 July 1914 – 20 October 1993), often known as Tommy Patton, was an Ulster unionist politician.

Patton grew up in Belfast, where he attended the Templemore Avenue School.  He worked at Harland and Wolff for twenty-nine years from 1932, when he moved to the Ulster Folk and Transport Museum.  He was elected to Belfast City Council for the Ulster Unionist Party (UUP) at the 1973 local election.  He retired in 1982, but continued to sit on the council, serving as Lord Mayor of Belfast that year.  He was appointed as High Sheriff of Belfast for 1992/3.

Patton has been described by journalist Jim McDowell as an example of a "cornerstone of what the unionist working class vote was".  Sinn Féin councillor Máirtín Ó Muilleoir notes Patton's malapropisms, giving an example of "the police are no detergent against the IRA". Another example was when he told a journalist that the City Hall would be painted in durex paint, rather dulux paint.

A park in east Belfast is named in Patton's memory.

References

1914 births
1993 deaths
High Sheriffs of Belfast
Lord Mayors of Belfast
Members of Belfast City Council
Officers of the Order of the British Empire
Ulster Unionist Party councillors